The Danbury Westerners are a collegiate summer baseball team based in Danbury, Connecticut. The team, a member of the New England Collegiate Baseball League, plays their home games at Rogers Park. The team played its inaugural season in 1995. The Danbury Westerners are the oldest active team in the NECBL. The Westerners compete in the Southern Division in the NECBL.

On August 12, 2021, the Westerners finally won their first NECBL championship as they defeated the North Shore Navigators in two games.

Postseason appearances

Alumni in MLB 
The Danbury Westerners have had 26 former players make it into the Big Leagues since playing with them. The first being Earl Snyder with Cleveland in 2002. Mark Malaska's #15 is the only number retired by Danbury as he was the first to win a championship, which he did in 2004 with Boston.

Bold denotes player is still active in MLB.

See also
 New England Collegiate Baseball League

References

External links
 Danbury Westerners Official Site
 NECBL Website

Danbury, Connecticut
New England Collegiate Baseball League teams
Amateur baseball teams in Connecticut
Baseball teams in the New York metropolitan area
1995 establishments in Connecticut
Baseball teams established in 1995
Sports in Fairfield County, Connecticut